Salem Camp Ground is a historic camp meeting site in Covington, Georgia. It was established in 1828. It was added to the National Register of Historic Places on March 5, 1998. It is located at 3940 Salem Road.

The interdenominational camp offers activities for children and adults. It has camper hook ups and a hotel and is intended as a place for peace, worship, reunion, and spiritual renewal.

The listing includes 33 contributing resources.

See also
National Register of Historic Places listings in Newton County, Georgia

References

Properties of religious function on the National Register of Historic Places in Georgia (U.S. state)
1828 establishments in Georgia (U.S. state)
Buildings and structures in Newton County, Georgia
Religious buildings and structures completed in 1828